Vepery is a suburb in the north of Chennai, India. Abutting the transportation hub of Park Town, the neighbourhood covers a rectangular area north of the Poonamallee High Road.

History
Vepery is among those oldest neighbourhoods developed during the British settlement in the city of Madras. Christian missionaries started arriving in the neighbourhood as early as 1749, soon after the treaty of Aix la Chapelle when the city was restored to the English from the French. The Vepery Mission is the oldest mission connected with the Church of England in India.

In 1828, St. Matthias Church was built, making it the second oldest Anglican Church after St. Mary's Church at Fort St. George. The church was officially consecrated on St. Matthias day in 1842 by the officiating Bishop Spencer of Madras.

On 1 March 1855, the Madras Parental Academic Institution and Doveton College were established at Vepery within the local limits of the then city of Madras. The surrounding area of Doveton acquired its name after Capt. John Doveton, who served as a captain commandant of the Seventh Regiment of Infantry.

Landmarks
Major landmarks include:

 Periyar Thidal
 Office of the Commissioner of Police
 Society for Prevention of Cruelty to Animals (SPCA)
 Doveton Tower Clock
 Vepery Police Station
Sambhavnath Jain temple

Educational Institutions

Colleges
 Madras Veterinary College
 P.T.Lee Chengalvaraya Naicker Polytechnic College
 St. Christopher's College of Education
 Guru Shree Shanthivijai Jain College For Women

Schools
 St. Matthias Anglo Indian Higher Secondary School
 The Doveton Corrie Group of Schools comprising the Doveton Girls' Higher Secondary School, the Doveton Boys' Higher Secondary School, the Doveton Matriculation Higher Secondary School, which is co- educational School and the Doveton Oakley School for kindergarten education.
 Bentinck Higher Secondary School for Girls
 St. Joseph Anglo Indian Boys Higher Secondary School
 St Aloysius Anglo Indian Girls Higher Secondary School 
 St. Pauls Higher Secondary School
 Seventh Day Adventist Matriculation Higher Secondary School
 Baynes Memorial Baptist Church School
 Guru Shree Shantivijay Jain Vidyalaya

Roads and Streets
Important roads and streets include :
 Vepery High Road
 Jermiah Road
 Barracks Road
 EVK Sampath Road
 Maddox Street
 Brethapeat Road
 Vepery Church Road
 Atkinson Road

References

Neighbourhoods in Chennai